Kupele Central (Central Baths) were public baths in the center of Bratislava, Slovakia. Soon after their opening they became too expensive to maintain. There were many visions that aimed to reconstruct or build an entirely new building.

After abandonment, Kupele Central began a life on its own. Various subcultures took the opportunity to gather at a place where "everything is possible". The building then included much street art and painting (mainly graffiti).

During 2008 the building was completely demolished and a construction of a new 100 million Euro office, residential and shopping complex named Central started. The construction works were finished in spring 2012.

Buildings and structures in Bratislava